Puls may refer to:
 Puls (surname)
 Puls (album), by Swedish pop group Gyllene Tider
 Puls (band), a Danish music band specializing in club dance music  
 Puls (beer brand), a brand produced by Viru Brewery, Estonia
 Puls (company), a company provides on-demand tech services
 Puls (food), a typical farro-based food of the Roman legions
 Puls (German radio station), a German, public radio station owned and operated by the Bayerischer Rundfunk (BR)
 Puls, Steinburg, a municipality in Schleswig-Holstein, Germany
 TV Puls, a Polish television channel
 Puls Biznesu, a Polish-language daily newspaper

See also
 Pulse (disambiguation)
 Pulß